The Eubacteriales are an order of bacteria placed within the class Clostridia.

Families
Eubacteriales comprises the following families:

 "Betainaceae" Jones et al. 2019
 "Bianqueaceae" Liu et al. 2021
 "Borkfalkiaceae" Hildebrand, Pallen & Bork 2020
 Caldicoprobacteraceae Yokoyama et al. 2010
 Christensenellaceae Morotomi, Nagai & Watanabe 2012
 Clostridiaceae Pribram 1933
 Defluviitaleaceae Jabari et al. 2012
 Eubacteriaceae Ludwig et al. 2010
 "Feifaniaceae" Liu et al. 2021
 "Galloscillospiraceae" Gilroy et al. 2021
 Gottschalkiaceae Poehlein et al. 2017c
 Hungateiclostridiaceae Zhang et al. 2018b
 Lachnospiraceae Rainey 2010
 "Mageeibacillaceae" Hildebrand, Pallen & Bork 2020
 "Mogibacteriaceae" Wylensek et al. 2020
 Oscillospiraceae Peshkoff 1940
 Peptoniphilaceae Johnson et al. 2014
 Peptostreptococcaceae Ezaki 2010
 Ruminococcaceae Rainey 2010
 "Pumilibacteraceae" Afrizal et al. 2021
 Thermohalobacteraceae Spring 2021
 Tissierellaceae Wu et al. 2020
 Vallitaleaceae Quéméneur et al. 2019
 Xylanivirgaceae Liu et al. 2020
 "Yeguiaceae" Liu et al. 2021

Genera Not Assigned to a Family
The following genera have been assigned to Clostridiales, but have not been assigned to a family.

 "Ca. Acetocimmeria" Smith et al. 2021
 Rhabdanaerobium Liu et al. 2017
 "Sinanaerobacter" Bao et al. 2021

Phylogeny
The currently accepted taxonomy based on the List of Prokaryotic names with Standing in Nomenclature (LPSN) and the National Center for Biotechnology Information (NCBI).

See also
 List of bacterial orders
 List of bacteria genera

References 

 
Bacteria orders